This is the list of all FC Midtjylland's European matches.

Overall record
Accurate as of 23 February 2023

Legend: GF = Goals For. GA = Goals Against. GD = Goal Difference.

Results

References

FC Midtjylland
Danish football clubs in international competitions